Robert Arthur Hall (November 30, 1930 – June 7, 2016) was a Canadian politician. He served in the Legislative Assembly of New Brunswick from 1982 to 1987, as a NDP member for the constituency of Tantramar. He was the first New Democrat to be elected to the legislature.

He had also served several terms on the village council of Port Elgin, New Brunswick, at one point having served as mayor of that community. Hall died in 2016 at the age of 85.

References

New Brunswick New Democratic Party MLAs
1930 births
New Brunswick New Democratic Party leaders
2016 deaths
New Brunswick municipal councillors
Mayors of places in New Brunswick